is a Japanese kabuki and film and television actor. Born , he is the eldest son of actor Nakamura Kanzaburō XVIII and the older brother of Nakamura Shichinosuke II. He is a well-known tachiyaku actor (kabuki actor who plays male roles) just like his father Kanzaburō XVIII and his younger brother Shichinosuke II (who is also known to be an renowned onnagata actor, i.e. he is a kabuki actor who plays female roles).

Names and lineage
Kankurō is a member of the acting guild Nakamura-ya and son of the celebrated Nakamura Kanzaburō XVIII. His younger brother, Shichinosuke II, also currently performs kabuki. Their family can trace their lineage back, within the kabuki world, at least seven generations, to Onoe Kikugorō III and Ichimura Uzaemon XI, who performed in the early 19th century. As is the case with the names of all kabuki actors, "Nakamura Kankurō" is a yagō or stage name.

Life and career
Kankurō made his first appearance on stage at the age of two, in a kokata monk role at the Kabuki-za. He formally received the name Nakamura Kantarō II at the age of six, playing alongside his younger brother as the title characters in Kadon de futari Momotarō ("The Two Momotarō Leave Home") at the Kabuki-za.

The year 2000 marked the 12th anniversary of the death of Kankurō's grandfather, actor Nakamura Kanzaburō XVII. Kankurō enjoyed the honor of playing the role of the elder shishi in the commemorative lion dance performance. The following year, he performed in the Renjishi lion dance, along with his brother and father, as part of a New Year's celebration. A temporary stage was set up on the beach at Naruto, near Tokyo.

Playing for the first time the role of Konami in the famous play Kanadehon Chūshingura in March 2001, Kankurō performed alongside the great onnagata Bandō Tamasaburō V.

Like his brother, and many other kabuki actors today, Kankurō also works in television and film. In 2004, he played Tōdō Heisuke in the NHK Taiga drama Shinsengumi!, reprising the role two years later in a historical television documentary. Kankurō currently narrates a TBS documentary program on UNESCO World Heritage Sites, and starred in the 2001 Japanese film Turn and 2009 film Zen, in which he played the monk Dōgen. He has also featured in a number of television dramas and other programs.

In February 2012, he received the name Nakamura Kankurō VI, following his father, who had performed under the name Kankurō V for almost forty-six years.

Filmography

Films
Turn (2001), Yohei Izumi
Zen (2009), Dōgen
The Kiyosu Conference (2013), Oda Nobutada
Sanada 10 Braves (2016), Sarutobi Sasuke
Gintama (2017), Isao Kondō
Gintama 2 (2018), Isao Kondō
Pocket Monsters the Movie: Coco (2020), Zarude

Television
Shinsengumi! (2004), Tōdō Heisuke
Aka Medaka (2013), Nakamura Kanzaburō XVIII
Idaten (2019), Shiso Kanakuri
Nakamura Nakazo: Shusse no Kizahashi (2021), Nakamura Nakazo I
What Will You Do, Ieyasu? (2023), Chaya Shirōjirō Kiyonobu

See also
 Nakamura Kanzaburō

References

External links
Nakamura-ya Official Site (Japanese)
Nakamura Kankurō VI at Kabuki21.com

Kabuki actors
1981 births
Living people
21st-century Japanese male actors
Taiga drama lead actors